Daniel K. Webster (born April 2, 1964 in Stoughton, Massachusetts) is an American attorney and politician who represented the 6th Plymouth District in the Massachusetts House of Representatives from 2003 to 2013. Webster is a graduate of Colby College in Maine and Suffolk University Law School in Boston.

References

1964 births
Republican Party members of the Massachusetts House of Representatives
People from Hanson, Massachusetts
Colby College alumni
Suffolk University alumni
Living people